= Sa-Ngor-Chotshog Centre =

- Location within Sikkim

Religion
- Affiliation: Tibetan Buddhism
- Sect: Sakyapa
- Festivals: Yarney, Losum Dasum

Location
- Location: Sikkim
- Country: India
- Interactive map of Sa-Ngor-Chotshog Centre
- Coordinates: 27.341°N 88.644°E

Architecture
- Established: 1961

Sa-Ngor-Chotshog Centre is a Buddhist monastery in Sikkim, northeastern India. It is the only monastery in Sikkim that belongs to the Sakyapa sect of Buddhism. It was founded in 1961.
